C. pulcher may refer to:

Calloctenus pulcher, a beetle in the family Cerambycidae
Calothorax pulcher, the beautiful sheartail, a hummingbird species
Cherax pulcher, a species of crayfish from Indonesia
Conus pulcher, a sea snail